Moghar (also Romanized as Moghār) is a village in Vargahan Rural District, in the Central District of Ahar County, East Azerbaijan Province, Iran. At the 2006 census, its population was 110, in 23 families.

References 

Populated places in Ahar County